Eastern March may refer to: 

 any frontier region (march) that is positioned towards the East
 Eastern March (Austria), a medieval march on the Danube river
 Eastern March (Saxony), a medieval march to the east of the Elbe river
 Eastern March (Scotland), a medieval march on Scottish border with England

See also
 Ostmark (disambiguation)
 German Eastern Marches Society